The Louisville Municipal School District is a public school district based in Louisville, Mississippi (USA). The district's boundaries parallel that of Winston County.

History
The first public school in Louisville was established in 1872. Winston County Schools and Louisville City Schools were consolidated in 1960 to become the Louisville Municipal School District.

Schools
Louisville High School (Grades 9-12)
Eiland Middle School (Grades 6-8)
Louisville Elementary School (Grades 3-5)
Fair Elementary School (Grades Pre-K-2)
Nanih Waiya School (Grades K-12)
Noxapater School (Grades K-12)

Demographics

2006-07 school year
There were a total of 2,883 students enrolled in the Louisville Municipal School District during the 2006–2007 school year. The gender makeup of the district was 49% female and 51% male. The racial makeup of the district was 63.65% African American, 34.69% White, 1.18% Native American, 0.35% Hispanic, and 0.14% Asian. 66.7% of the district's students were eligible to receive free lunch.

Previous school years

Accountability statistics

See also

List of school districts in Mississippi

References

External links
 

Education in Winston County, Mississippi
School districts in Mississippi
School districts established in 1960